John Waddington may refer to:

 John Waddington (minister) (1810–1880), English congregational cleric
 John Waddington (colonial administrator) (1890–1957), English colonial administrator, Governor of Barbados and of Northern Rhodesia 
 John Waddington (priest) (1910–1994), Anglican Provost of St Edmundsbury
 John Waddington (South African cricketer) (1918–1985), South African cricketer, played for Griqualand West 1934–59
 John Waddington (Essex cricketer) (1910–1995), English cricketer, played for Essex in 1931
 John Waddington (footballer) (born 1938), Australian rules footballer
 John Waddington (musician), British guitarist, formerly of The Pop Group
 John Waddington Limited, card and board game company
 John A. Waddington New Jersey politician